Bivincula is a genus of moths of the family Bombycidae. The genus was erected by Wolfgang Dierl in 1978.

Selected species
 Bivincula diaphana (Moore, 1879)
 Bivincula watsoni Dierl, 1978

References

Bombycidae